Heracleides, son of Aristogenes, was a Syracusan who was one of the commanders of the Syracusan squadron sent to co-operate with the Lacedaemonians and their allies. He joined Tissaphernes at Ephesus just in time to take part in the defeat of the Athenians under Thrasyllus in 409 BC.

Notes

Ancient Greek admirals
5th-century BC Syracusans
People of the Peloponnesian War